Remas is a village and a former municipality in Fier County, western Albania. At the 2015 local government reform it became a subdivision of the municipality Divjakë. The population at the 2011 census was 4,449. The neighbouring villages are Mucias, Karavasta and Bedat.

References

Former municipalities in Fier County
Administrative units of Divjakë
Villages in Fier County